The 1955 season was the 50th season of competitive football in Norway.

Hovedserien 1954/55

Group A

Group B

Championship final
June 5: Larvik Turn - Fredrikstad 4-2

Landsdelsserien 1954/55

Group Østland/Søndre

Group Østland/Nordre

Group Sørland/Vestland, A1

Group Sørland/Vestland, A2

5. Djerv 1919 14 6 1 7 21-27 13

Group Sørland/Vestland, B

Group Møre

Group Trøndelag

Play-off Sørland/Vestland
 Jerv - Bryne 2-2 (extra time)
 Bryne - Jerv 2-1
 Bryne - Varegg 2-3

Varegg promoted.

Play-off Møre/Trøndelag
 Kvik - Kristiansund 4-0
 Kristiansund - Kvik 2-1 (agg. 2-5)

Kvik (Trondheim) promoted.

First Division 1954/55

District I
 1. Greåker (Promoted)
 2. Selbak
 3. Lisleby
 4. Tune
 5. Torp
 6. Hafslund
 7. Mysen
 8. Tistedalen

District II, Group A
 1. Drafn (Play-off)
 2. Mjøndalen
 3. Spartacus
 4. Solberg
 5. Grüner
 6. Jevnaker
 7. Stabæk
 8. Hard

District II, Group B
 1. Aurskog (Play-off)
 2. Sagene
 3. Aasen
 4. Sandaker
 5. Steinberg
 6. Grue
 7. Drammens BK
 8. Birkebeineren

District III
 1. Hamar IL (Play-off)
 2. Vang
 3. Gjøvik SK
 4. Fremad
 5. Mesna
 6. Vardal
 7. Brumunddal
 8. Storhamar

District IV, Group A
 1. Sem (Play-off)
 2. Borg
 3. Storm
 4. Brevik
 5. Kragerø
 6. Holmestrand
 7. Borre
 8. Stag

District IV, Group B
 1. Herkules (Play-off)
 2. Skiens BK
 3. Urædd
 4. Ulefoss
 5. Drangedal
 6. Rjukan
 7. Fossum (Skien)
 8. Sp.klubben 31

District V, Group A1 (Aust-Agder)
 1. Nedenes (Play-off)
 2. Rygene
 3. Risør
 4. Arendals BK
 5. Trauma
 Lillesand (withdrew)

District V, Group A2 (Vest-Agder)
 1. Vigør (Play-off)
 2. Mandalskam.
 3. Vindbjart
 4. Farsund
 5. Torridal
 6. Lyngdal

District V, group B1 (Rogaland)
 1. Varhaug (Promoted)
 2. Jarl
 3. Klepp
 4. Vaulen
 5. Egersund
 6. Ganddal

District V, Group B2 (Rogaland)
 1. Kopervik (Promoted)
 2. Buøy
 3. Torvastad
 4. Haugar
 5. Randaberg
 6. Sauda

District VI, Group A (Bergen)
 1. Fjellkameratene (Play-off)
 2. Sandviken
 3. Trane
 4. Hardy
 5. Laksevåg
 6. Minde
 7. Bergens-Sparta

District VI, Group B (Midthordland)
 1. Fana (Play-off)
 2. Voss
 3. Erdal
 4. Ålvik
 5. Fyllingen
 6. Florvåg
 7. Eidsvåg (Åsane)

District VII, Group A (Sunnmøre)
 1. Herd (Play-off)
 2. Ørsta
 3. Aksla
 4. Volda
 5. Skarbøvik
 6. Hovdebygda
 7. Spjelkavik
 8. Stranda

District VII, Group B (Romsdal)
 1. Træff (Play-off)
 2. Isfjorden
 3. Kleive
 4. Eide
 5. Åndalsnes
 6. Olymp
 7. Frode

District VII, Group C (Nordmøre)
 1. Braatt (Play-off)
 2. Halsa
 3. Dahle
 4. Enge
 5. Sunndal
 6. Goma
 7. Nordlandet
 8. Averøykam.

District VIII, Group A1 (Sør-Trøndelag)
 1. Hommelvik (Play-off)
 2. Heimdal
 3. Flå
 4. Steinar
 5. Leik
 6. Børsa

District VIII, Group A2 (Sør-Trøndelag)
 1. Troll (Play-off)
 2. Løkken
 3. Orkanger
 4. Svorkmo
 5. Rindal
 6. Dalguten

District VIII, Group B (Trondheim og omegn)
 1. Wing (Play-off)
 2. National
 3. Tryggkameratene
 4. Trond
 5. Ørn (Trondheim)
 6. Nidar
 7. NTHI
 Nidelv withdrew

District VIII, Group C (Fosen)
 1. Opphaug (Play-off)
 2. Stadsbygd
 3. Beian
 4. Rissa
 5. Uthaug
 Lensvik disqualified

District VIII, Group D (Nord-Trøndelag/Namdal)
 1. Stjørdal (Play-off)
 2. Malm
 3. Nessegutten
 4. Namsos
 5. Blink
 6. Varden (Meråker)
 7. Skogn
 8. Bangsund

District IX
 1. Bodø/Glimt
 2. Brønnøysund
 3. Saltdalkam.
 4. Mo
 5. Grand
 6. Stålkameratene

District X (Unofficial)
 1. Harstad
 2. Narvik/Nor
 3. Tromsø
 4. Mjølner
 5. Finnsnes

Play-off District II/III
 Drafn - Aurskog 2-2
 Aurskog - Hamar 1-2
 Hamar - Drafn 1-1

Table

Championship District II
 Aurskog - Drafn 3-2

Play-off District IV
 Herkules - Sem 1-0
 Sem - Herkules 0-1 (agg. 0-2)

Herkules promoted

Play-off District V
 Vigør - Nedenes 1-2
 Nedenes - Vigør 3-1 (agg. 5-2)

Nedenes promoted.

Championship District V
 Varhaug - Kopervik 2-2
 Kopervik - Varhaug 0-2 (agg. 2-4)
 Nedenes - Varhaug 0-5

Play-off District VI
 Fana - Fjellkameratene 4-1
 Fjellkameratene - Fana 1-3

Fana promoted

Play-off District VII
 Træff - Braatt 5-2
 Herd - Træff 0-2
 Braatt - Herd 4-2

Table

Play-off District VIII
 Hommelvik - Stjørdal 1-2
 Stjørdal - Wing 1-2
 Wing - Hommelvik 1-0

Table

4. Opphaug withdrew

Relegation play-off District IV
 Holmestrand-Rjukan 1-3

Holmestrand relegated

Norwegian Cup

Final

Northern Norwegian Cup

Final

National team

Note: Norway's goals first 
Explanation:
F = Friendly

  
Seasons in Norwegian football